Coalition for Europe (CEU) was a Spanish electoral list in the European Parliament election in 2014 made up from regionalist parties. It was the successor of the 2009 coalition of the same name. As in 2009, Ramon Tremosa was confirmed as the coalition's leading candidate.

Composition

Electoral performance

European Parliament

References

Defunct political party alliances in Spain
Regionalist parties in Spain